David Markey Yates is an Australian judge. He has been a Judge of the Federal Court of Australia since November 2009. Prior to his appointment, Yates practised as a Senior Counsel in Sydney.

Yates graduated from the University of Sydney with a Bachelor of Laws. He was admitted as a solicitor in 1977 and as a barrister in 1982, becoming Senior Counsel in 1997.  While at the bar, Yates worked actively in intellectual property, being a member of the Intellectual Property Committee of the Law Council of Australia, heading the Intellectual Property Section of the New South Wales Bar Association, and being a member of the New South Wales Committee of the Intellectual Property Society of Australia and New Zealand.

See also
List of Judges of the Federal Court of Australia

References

Australian Senior Counsel
Living people
Place of birth missing (living people)
Year of birth missing (living people)
Judges of the Federal Court of Australia